The 2010 SCCA Pro Formula Enterprises season was the inaugural season of the SCCA Pro Formula Enterprises. The series was sanctioned by SCCA Pro Racing. All drivers competed in Mazda powered, Hoosier shod Van Diemen DP06's.

Sean Rayhall won the championship in the final round of the season over Scott Rettich.

Race calendar and results

Final standings

References

2010 in American motorsport